Wendell Tangborn (August 22, 1927 – October 3, 2020) was an American glaciologist specializing in glacier mass balance measurements since 1960, chiefly within the states of Washington and Alaska of the Pacific Northwest. His streamflow forecasting model implemented a split-sample calibration approach which greatly improved its accuracy, and eliminated the need for manual measurements such as snow surveys. This model has been utilized by hydroelectric utilities for over thirty years to forecast Columbia River runoff. His PTAA glacier balance model required only routine weather observations and has been successfully applied to calculate the mass balance of glaciers throughout the world, including the Himalayas.

Tangborn worked on a project based on the PTAAGMB Model to study and provide glacier mass balances for 150 or more glaciers around the world, The PTAAGMB Project (ptaagmb.com).  He also made an effort to provide the PTAAGMB model technologies to other glaciologists and scientists, to help promote understanding and awareness of what is happening to the world's glaciers, and to help provide data that could demonstrate links between climate change and human activities.

Tangborn co-authored, among many other papers, a seminal paper that examined the hydrological budget of South Cascade Glacier (Tangborn and others, 1975). By measuring precipitation and snowmelt in the basin, the mass balance of the glacier, and the glacial runoff, he showed that the glacier stored significant volumes of water not only for weeks but perhaps for months. This was one of the few papers to quantify the hydrologic balance of a temperate glacier.  Ahead of its time, it preceded by years our general understanding of increased winter and spring water storage within temperate glaciers. The intent of the paper, however, was to compare three different and commonly used methods of estimating glacier mass balance (the glaciological, hydrological and geodetic methods). As a result of the water storage processes discovered by Tangborn, this paper has contributed to a current consensus that liquid water in glaciers is a critical element for predicting and understanding the disintegration of the Greenland and Antarctic ice sheets. 

Tangborn wrote the children’s book, Glaciers (recently translated into Chinese), as illustrated by Marc Simont, which introduced children to how and where glaciers form, how they move, and how they shape the land.

Wendell is the brother of Army Silver Star recipient, Virgil John Tangborn, in whose memory Wendell published the book Appointment in Amfreville: A Memoir of Virgil Tangborn, in 2016.

See also 
 Glacier mass balance
 Global warming
 Greenland Ice Sheet Project
 PTAA GMB Model

References

External links 
 All About Glaciers: Further reading National Snow and Ice Data Center
 The PTAA Glacier Mass Balance Project "glaciers may be melting away at an unprecedented rate."
  Wendell Tangborn, The Guardian
 Wendell Tangborn Biography @HyMet.com

1927 births
2020 deaths
American glaciologists